Cooch Behar, also known as Koch Bihar, was a princely state in India during the British Raj. The state was placed under the Bengal States Agency, part of the Eastern States Agency of the Bengal Presidency. It is located south of the Himalayan kingdom of Bhutan, in present-day West Bengal.

Cooch Behar State was formed when the Kamata Kingdom under the Koch dynasty split following the death of Nara Narayan in 1586. The eastern portion, Koch Hajo, was soon absorbed by Ahom. The western portion, Koch Bihar, formed a separate unit that came under direct challenge by the Mughal Empire. After weathering the Mughal threat, a new foe emerged in the form of an expansionist Bhutanese kingdom. After a series of wars with the Bhutanese and Tibetans, the Northern threat was pushed back but not before a Bhutanese regent was installed in the royal court. The Koch Bihar court decided to invite British intervention. This came in the form of military assistance that—acting in concert with Koch Bihar forces—ended the Northern challenge once and for all. However the British East India Company sought guarantees whereby the independence of Koch Bihar was limited by treaties. When the British colonial rule was finally terminated in India, the Koch Bihar state immediately acceded to and merged with India in 1949 and became a part of West Bengal.  The district, Cooch Behar District, is named after this erstwhile kingdom.

History

Early history: Mughal conflicts (1587–1680)
The Kamata kingdom split at a time when the Mughals under Akbar were aggressively expanding their empire. The state soon became a dependency of, and slowly lost territory to, the Mughal empire.

Lakshmi Narayan (1587–1621), Nara Narayan's son, was the first ruler of the Koch Bihar portion of the former Kamata kingdom. He was an ineffectual ruler.  After losing much territory to the Mughal commander Ali Kuli Khan, he accepted Mughal sovereignty and assistance in defending against his neighbours. The next Mughal emperor, Jahangir, again attacked Bihar and captured territory including Tripura. Lakshmi Narayan went to Delhi and won guarantees for his much-reduced state.  On his return, he established his capital at the Atharokotha village. Lakshmi Narayan was a patron of scholars and the arts.  He partially restored the Shiva Temple of Jalpesh, but did not complete construction of the temple during his lifetime. Influenced by Madhavdeva, a famous preacher, he made Ekasarana dharma the state religion.

Bir Narayan (1621–1626), Lakshmi Narayan's son and successor, was a pleasure-loving ruler who failed to exert his authority to levy taxes on the king of Bhutan. In his peaceful reign, he sponsored schools for the aristocracy and supported intellectuals.  His successor Pran Narayan (1626–1665) ruled in peace until 1657, when a struggle for succession in the Mughal empire began between Aurangzeb and his brothers.  Pran Narayan invaded Bengal. However, by this time Aurangzeb had consolidated his power and sent his armies to invade Bihar and Assam. Pran Narayan retreated to the mountains and waged a guerrilla war for three years, finally making a pact with the Mughal Nawab Shaista Khan in 1664. During his rule, the Behar kingdom expanded to Tajhat Baharband Pargana in the south, Basakpur near Khutaghat of Goalapara district in the east and Bhatgaon within Morang in the west. Thus Koch Bihar maintained some of its sovereignty

Maharaja Pran Narayan rebuilt the temples of Baneswar, Shandeswar and the Kamteswari temple of Gosanimari. He sent for architects from Delhi to complete the Jalpesh temple, but the work was not completed in his lifetime. He constructed broad highways and bridges, and many beautiful buildings in his capital. He was a patron of the arts.

Madan Narayan or Mod Narayan (1665–1680) succeeded Pran Narayan after a short struggle with his brothers. For some time, the power behind the throne was Mahi Narayan, who had been Nazir (summoner) for his father. After a fierce struggle, Madan Narayan gained control and Mahi Narayan fled to  Bhutan. Madan Narayan began a survey of his lands and a register of landholdings. He completed the construction of the Jalpesh Shiva temple, providing lands for the temple's maintenance.

Conflict with Bhutan and Tibet (1680–1772)

The growing power of Bhutan saw the turmoil in Behar and the waning authority of the Mughals as an opportunity to extend their influence and control. They provided support to competitors for the throne of Koch Bihar, and later attempted outright annexation.

On the death of Madan Narayan with no immediate successor, the sons of the Nazir Mahi Narayan attacked Behar, assisted by the Bhutan army. The Raikats of Baikunthapur, distant relatives of the royal family based in the Jalpaiguri area, sent troops and helped force the Bhutia army to retreat. The Raikats crowned Basudev Narayan (1680–1682), Madan Narayan's brother, as Maharajah and helped establish peace before returning to their home. Two years later, Yajna Narayan and Jagat Narayan (sons of Nazir Mahi) attacked Behar again with Bhutanese troops, captured the palace and massacred the royal family, including Basudev Narayan. The Raikats Yogyadev and Bhujdev intervened again, defeating Yajna Narayan in a battle on the banks of the Mansai river. The Raikats then crowned Mahendra Narayan (1682–1693), a five-year-old grandson of Pran Narayan, as the next Maharajah.

During the minority rule of Mahendra Narayan, the state was unsettled. The lords of places such as Tepa, Manthana Kakina and Karjirhat rejected Bihari rule in place of direct tribute to the Mughal rulers as zamindars (landlords) of their territories. They accepted the authority of, and paid taxes to, Ibrahim Khan the Mughal Faujdar of Ghoraghat and Dhaka. Even the Raikat princes of Baikunthapur and Pangar transferred loyalty to these powers. The Mughals chose this time to attack Behar. With no other choice, Mahendra made a pact with Yajna Narayan and appointed him as Nazir. Aided by the Bhutanese, Yajna Narayan fought the Mughals at Patgram but was defeated. The Mughals took Boda, Patgram and eastern Pargana in the year 1711 and had gained near full control of North Bengal once again.

Mahendra Narayan died at the age of 16. With the main royal line extinct, Rup Narayan (1693–1714), a grandson of Nazir Mahi Narayan, became the next Maharajah. Rup Narayan was a strong and popular ruler, but made the mistake of attacking the Mughal Faujdar of Rangpur. Defeated, he lost Karjihat, Kakina and Fatehpur Chakla, retaining only Boda, Patgram and eastern Chakla. Soon after, he lost these territories too, and was reduced to holding the three Chaklas under lease to the Mughals in the name of his Najir. He moved his capital from Atharokotha to a new site,  Guriahati on the east bank of the Torsa River, where he built a beautiful temple of Sri Madan Mohan Thakur.

Upendra Narayan (1714–1763), the next ruler, had no son of his own. He adopted Deena Narayan, the son of dewan Satya Narayan, and gave him considerable powers, but did not formally grant him the succession to the throne. Deena Narayan met the Mughal Faujdar Md. Ali Khan at Rangpur and agreed to accept Mughal supremacy in return for Md. Ali Khan's support in gaining the throne. Md. Ali Khan invaded, but was forced back by a combined army from Behar and Bhutan and had to flee to Rangpur.

Late in life, Upendra Narayan's second queen gave birth to a male child, Debendra Narayan (1763–1765), who ascended the throne at the age of four. His short reign was chaotic. The Bhutias annexed further land in the north of Behar, and their ambassador in the capital of Behar became the de facto ruler of the state. The young maharaja was assassinated in a palace plot at the age of six.

On 12 August 1765, the British East India Company took over control of Bengal. The Maharaja of Bihar now had to pay rent to the East India company for Boda, Patgram, Panga and other chaklas in Bengal that they had previously paid to Mughal administration.

After Debendra Narayan's assassination, Debraj, king of Bhutan, sent troops to arrest Rajguru Ramananda Goswami, the leader of the assassination plot. The Behar court agreed to crown Dhairjendra Narayan (1765–1770), a cousin of Debendra Narayan, as Maharaja. However, he was a puppet of Bhutan: the Bhutanese ambassador Pensuthma was the effective ruler. Bhutan seized direct control of Behar territories including Jalpeswar, Mandas, Jalash, Lakshmipur, Santarabari, Maraghat and Bholka. During this time there was large scale famine. The court degenerated into intrigues and conspiracies. Eventually, Debraj of Bhutan arrested Dhairjendra Narayan and took him to the Bhutanese capital Punakh, crowning Rajendra Narayan (1770–1772) in his place as nominal ruler. After a short "reign", Rajendra Narayan died of a fever in 1772.

Maharaja Rajendra Narayan left no heir. The Bhutias attempted to take over direct control, seizing the royal regalia, but the court rebelled and enthroned Dharendra Narayan (1772–1775). The Koch warlords once again rallied their banners and chased the Bhutanese-Tibetan-Khampa forces out of the Northern areas of Koch Behar.  Pensuthma -the Bhutanese regent- fled back to Bhutan, whose King sent troops to invade Behar. After some fighting, the Bhutanese regained control and established a new puppet ruler, a child whom they installed in Chekakhata in Bhutan. On his early death, the Bhutias finally attempted direct control, garrisoning forts in strategic positions. However most tracts of the extensive North Bengal region remained fiercely opposed to any Northern control. As, for example, an important warlord — Rupan Singh of Rahimganj Pargana — maintained that the Bhutanese presence in North Bengal was illegal and issued directives to the Bhutan court to pull back their forces.

British East India Company acquires control

Maharaja Dharendra Narayan appealed to the British, rulers of Bengal, for assistance in regaining his kingdom in exchange for a large payment. However, the Governor General Warren Hastings rejected the terms and insisted on an agreement by which the Maharaja would pay an annual tribute to the Company in exchange for protection: in effect an agreement to accept the supremacy of the British. The British then sent a regiment commanded by Mr. Paling from Kalikata (Calcutta/Kolkata) who marched through Rangpur towards Mughalhat, joined on their route by Behar forces from all the warlords and the chiefs of North Bengal. After a series of sharp encounters with the Bhutanese forces, the British-Koch coalition force captured the capital (1772) and moved forward into southern Bhutan.  
 
Unwilling to go further into the difficult hill country, the British negotiated a peace agreement (25 April 1774) with Bhutan in exchange for surrender of Bihar royal captives, Bhutan agreeing to return to its pre-1730 boundaries, and a symbolic tribute of five horses. The British left a small garrison in Behar, and withdrew the main army to Rangpur.  When Dhairjendra Narayan realised that he had exchanged one master for another, and had permanently lost independence of his ancestral land, he abdicated in favour of Dharendra Narayan, who reigned until his death in 1775, when Dhairjendra Narayan resumed the throne (1775–1783)

From now on, until the transfer of control to the State of India in 1947, Koch Behar was a princely state subject to overall British Suzerainty.

Subsequent princely rulers under the British East India company were Harendra Narayan (1783–1839), followed by Shivendra Narayan (1839–1847) and then by Narendra Narayan (1847–1863).

Rulers

The rulers of Cooch Behar State held the title of 'Maharaja' from 1884 onwards. They were entitled to a 13 gun salute by the British authorities. The last ruler signed the instrument of accession to the Indian Union on 1 January 1950.

Rajas
 1533 - 1587 Nara Narayan
 1587 – 1621 Lakshmi Narayan
 1621 – 1626 Bir Narayan
 1626 – 1665 Pran Narayan
 1665 – 1680 Mad Narayan
 1680 – 1682 Basudev Narayan
 1682 – 1693 Mahendra Narayan
 1693 – 1714/1715     Rup Narayan        
 1714/1715 – 1763      Upendra Narayana 
 1763 – 12 August 1765     Debendra Narayana    (1759–1765) 
 1763 – 12 August 1765     .... -Regent
 1765 – 1770      Dhairjendra Narayan (1st time)     (died 1783) 
 1770 – 1772     Rajendra Narayan    (died 1772) 
 1770 – 1772     Pensuthma -Bhutanese Regent
 1772       Dharendra Narayan (1st time)       (died 1775)
 1772 – 1774     Bijendra Narayan     (died 1774) 
 1774 – 1775    Dharendra Narayan (2nd time)       (s.a.)
 1775 – 1783   Dhairjendra Narayan (2nd time)     (s.a.) 
 1783 – 29 May 1839    Harendra Narayan     (1780–1839) 
 1783 – 1801     .... -Regents
 1836 – 1839     Bajendra Narayan -Regent (1st time) (died 1857) 
 29 May 1839 – 23 August 1847  Shivendra Narayan  (1796–1847) 
 23 August 1847 –  6 August 1863  Narendra Narayan   (1841–1863) (personal style Maharaja from 1862)
 30 March 1847 – 1857  Bajendra Narayan - Regent (2nd time) (s.a.) 
 1857 – 1860   Regents
    – Maharani Kameshwari (f) (died 1889)
  – Maharani Vrindeshwari (f)   
 6 August 1863 – 16 October 1884  Nripendra Narayan   (1862–1911) (personal style Maharaja from 25 February 1880) 
 6 August 1863 –  8 November 1883  Regents
   – Maharani Kameshwari (f)  (s.a.) 
  – Maharani Vrindeshwari (f)
   – Maharani Nistarini Deo (f)
 1911 – 1913 – Raj Rajendra Narayan
 1913 – 1922 – Jitendra Narayan
 1922 – 1949 – Jagaddipendra Narayan (born – 15 December, 1915 – died – 11 April, 1970)
 1922 – 1938 Reagent
 – Maharani Indira Devi (f)

Maharajas

Later princes and notables

Following the Indian Mutiny, the British East India Company was dissolved, replaced by direct rule from the British government: the British Raj. Although the princely state of Cooch Behar was very small, it enjoyed a certain prominence since it was one of the very few states to lie within relatively easy distance of Calcutta, the hub of the British Raj. Due to this proximity, the Royal Family embraced westernisation and this resulted in the family enjoying an ascendancy in British official circles, as well as in London society. The colonial government granted it 13-gun salutes and included it in the Salute States.

The family in the 20th century

First generation in the 20th century

Col. Maharaja Sir Nripendra Narayan (ruled 1863–1911) was born on 4 October 1862. He died on 18 September 1911. and was educated privately and later in England. He was admitted to Presidency College, Calcutta, to study Law till 1881. He was married in 1878 to Maharani Suniti Devi Sen, who was born in 1864 and was the daughter of Maharishi Keshub Chandra Sen. He was conferred the title of Imperial Order of Crown on the occasion of Queen Victoria's Jubilee celebrations. He died in 1911. They had four sons and three daughters. 

Maharani Sunity Devi was born to famous Bengali reformer Kesub Chandra Sen. She was a staunch member of the Brahmo Samaj up until her death. She was married to Maharaja Nripendra Narayan on 7 February 1878 in Cooch Behar according to Bhrahmo Traditions and in the presence of Hindu priests. She was also a friend of the Marchioness of Dufferin, and was a popular figure in the Calcutta social circles. She also composed several works of fiction and an autobiography. One of her works of friction included a series of stories about pious Indian women. This book was dedicated to her friend Queen Alexandra. She died in Bengal Nagpur Railway Hotel, Ranchi in November 1932.

Second generation in the 20th century

Maharaja Raj Rajendra Narayan Bhup Bahadur (ruled 1911–13) was born on 11 April 1882 in Calcutta, and died unmarried 1 September 1913 in London. His ashes were buried in Cooch Behar. He was educated at Mayo College, Ajmer, in 1893, and then was sent to England in 1894 for further studies, gaining entry into an Oxford College in 1900.

Maharaja Jitendra Narayan Bhup Bahadur (ruled 1913–22) was born on 20 December 1886 at Cooch Behar Palace. He has the brother of the previous Maharaja. He died on 20 December 1922. He was educated privately under a British home tutor, and then admitted to Itan School in 1900. Later, he was admitted to the University of Edinburgh. He was married on 25 August 1913 in London to Maharani Indira Devi (1892–1968). She was the daughter of Maharaja Gaekwad Sir Sayajiro III Khanderao Gaekwad, Sena Khas Khel Shamsher Bahadur Farzand-i-Khas-i-Daulat-i-Inglishia of Baroda, and his second wife, Maharani Gajra Bai.

Maharaj Kumari Sukriti Devi ("Princess Girlie") was born in 1884. She died 1958.
She was married in 1899 (sep'd.) to Jyotsnanath Ghosal, C.I.E., I.C.S. [cr.1918], the Zamindar of Belgaum, and had issue.

The younger daughters of Maharaja Nripendra Narayan and Maharani Sunity Devi, were named Pravita Devi and Sudhira Devi. They were born in 1891 and 1894 respectively. They were married to a pair of siblings called Lionel Mander and Alan Mander respectively. Pravita devi had no issues. Sudhira Devi had two daughters Geeta and Garbo and a son Derek. Garbo is presently residing at London.

Third generation in the 20th century

Ila Devi, the eldest child of the Maharaja Jitendra Narayan and his wife Maharani Indira Devi, was born in 1914. Her name was suggested by Lord Carmichael, the then Governor of Bengal and a close friend of the Maharaja. She attended Ravenscroft School in Eastbourne. She later went to Santiniketan along with her sister Gayatri, and met her future husband Romendro Kishore Deb Burman, a cousin of the Maharaja of Tripura. They were married secretly in a register office in 1935 and were formally married the same year. They had three children, Manabendra (Bhim), Devika and Bharat (Habi). She died in 1945 at the age of thirty.

Lt.Col. (Hon) Maharaja Sir Jagaddipendra Narayan Bhup Bahadur (ruled 1922–1970) was born on 15 December 1915 at Cooch Behar Palace, and died on 11 April 1970 in Calcutta. He was educated at Harrow in 1927–1929 and Trinity Hall, Cambridge, in 1929–1934. He was awarded the K.C.I.E. [cr.1945] and was made the 7th Light Cavalry in the Indian Army. He served in World War II, and was granted full ruling powers on 6 April 1936. He married firstly about 1950 (div.) Nancy Valentine who was born on St. Albans, Long Island, and who was a Hollywood actress. He married secondly Gina Egan.

Maharaj Kumar Indrajit Narayan was the second son and the third child of Maharaja Nripendra Narayan and his wife Maharani Indira Devi. He was born in 1918 in Poona, Bombay State. He went a day school in London and was also educated in England later. He passed out of the Indian Military Academy at Dehra Dun and obtained a commission in the 7th Light Cavalry at Bolarum. He was engaged in 1942 to the Princess of Pitampura, Kamala Devi. They were married soon after. They had two children, Uttara Devi and Maharaja Vijendra Narayan of Cooch Behar. He died in 1951 in Darjeeling from a fire.

Maharani Gayatri Devi was born on 23 May 1919 in London. She was educated at Shantiniketan, Lausanne, Switzerland, London School of Secretaries, Brilliantmont and Monkey Club London. She was married on 9 May 1940 to Saramad-i-Rajahai Hindustan Raj Rajendra Shri Maharajadhiraj Sir Sawai Man Singh II Bahadur of Jaipur, and they had issue. She was the president of the All India Badminton Association, the vice-president of the All India Lawn Tennis Association, the All India Swatantra Party, and the Rajasthan State Swatantra Party. She was the director of the Rambagh Palace Hotel, Jaipur, and Gee Stud Farm Pvt Ltd., chairman of the Governing Council of Maharani Gayatri Devi Girls Public School, Jaipur, chairman of the board of trustees of Maharaja Sawai Jai Singh Benevolent Trust, Jaipur, the Maharani Gayatri Soldier's Welfare Fund, Jaipur; the Sawai Ram Singh Shilp Kala Mandir, Jaipur; M/s Jaipur Durries Pvt Ltd, Jalpur and Rajasthan State Tourist Development Corporation, Jaipur; Member of the 3rd, 4th and 5th Lok Sabha; author of A Princess Remembers and A Government's Gateway; interests include photography, fine arts and museums.

Menaka Devi, the third daughter and the youngest child of Maharaja Nripendra Narayan and his wife Maharani Indira Devi was born in 1920 in London. She was married to Yeshwantrao Singh, the Maharaja of Dewas Jr and had a son Udaya

Fourth and last generation in the 20th century

Maharaja Virajendra Narayan, the son of Indrajit Narayan and Kamala Devi was born in 1944. He was instilled as the Maharaja only after his uncle's death in 1970. His accession to the throne was a symbolic gesture and had no temporal significance. He died in 1992.

Uttara Devi, the daughter of  Indrajit Narayan and Kamala Devi was born in 1942. She is married to the Maharao Brijraj Singh of Kotah. She has two children.

Famous women of the Cooch Behar family

As the Maharani of Cooch Behar, Indira Raje ruled as regent after her husband's early death at the age of 36, and later became popular in the salons of Europe, earning the sobriquet "the ranee of Cooch". She was popularly known as Ma In Cooch Behar and other social circles of Calcutta.

One of their daughters, Gayatri Devi, married the Maharaja of Jaipur, Sawai Raja Man Singh, and became an international celebrity; she was at one time in the middle of the twentieth century considered to be one of the most beautiful ladies in the world. Another daughter, Menaka Devi, married the Maharaja of Dewas (Jr.). Ila Devi; their eldest daughter married into the Royal Family of Tripura. Her great-granddaughters are Ria and Raima, daughters of Moon Moon Sen.

Dewans (Chief ministers)
 1693 – 1714                Satya Narayan
 1714 – 17..                Kumar Dina Narayan
 c. 1738                     Kharga Narayan
 1765 – 1770                Ram Narayan
 1770                       Hareswar Karjee
 1770 – 17..                Surendra Narayan
 17.. – 1785?               Kamar Surendra Narayan
 c. 1789                     Kashi Kanta Lahiri
 1791 – 1793                Joy Gopal Singh
 1796 – 1797                Shyam Chandra Chatterjee
 1797 – 1802                Padma Mochun + Kasinath Lahiri     (died 1802)
 1802 – 1803                Guru Prasad Rai (1st time)
 1803 – 1804                Radha Krishna Lahiri (1st time)
 1804 – 1806                Joy Gopal Singh                    (died 1806)
 1806 – 1808                Choa Lal Sarkar                    (died 1808)
 1808 – 1811                Radha Krishna Lahiri (2nd time)
 1811 – 1816                Guru Prasad Rai (2nd time)
 1816 – 1825                Radha Krishna Lahiri (3rd time)
 1825 – 1829                Kalichandra Lahiri (1st time)
 1829 – 1842                Ramchandra Lahiri
 1842 – 1844                Kalichandra Lahiri (2nd time)
 1844 – c. 1847              Kali Krishna Lahiri
 c. 1864 – Dec 1868          Babu Nil Kamal Sanyal              (died 1868)
 Aug 1869 – c. 1903          Kalika Das Datta (Dutt)            (1841 – after 1900)

See also
 Rajbongshi people
 Cooch Behar Municipality
 Cooch Behar Palace
 Eastern States Agency
 Political integration of India
 Hussain Muhammad Ershad, former President of Bangladesh who belonged to an elite family of the Cooch Behar State

Notes

References

External links
 Koch Bihar Royal History
 Koch Bihar genealogy
 

History of Cooch Behar
Princely states of India
1586 establishments in India
1949 disestablishments in India
Former states and territories of India